Patrick van Loon (born 27 March 1974) is a Dutch judoka.

Achievements

See also
European Judo Championships
History of martial arts
List of judo techniques
List of judoka
Martial arts timeline

References

1974 births
Living people
Dutch male judoka
20th-century Dutch people